Gold is a 2014 Irish comedy-drama film directed by Niall Heery, who co-wrote the screenplay with his brother Brendan Heery. It stars James Nesbitt, David Wilmot, Kerry Condon, and Maisie Williams. The film follows a man making an unwelcome appearance at the family home for the first time in 12 years.

It premiered at the 12th Jameson Dublin International Film Festival on 22 February 2014, and was theatrically released in Ireland and the United Kingdom by Wildcard Distribution on 10 October 2014. The film was praised for the performances of the cast, with both Nesbitt and Condon receiving IFTA Award nominations.

Plot
The film depicts an estranged father (Wilmot) returning to his hometown, after an absence of twelve years to visit his dying father. Ray awkwardly uses the opportunity to reconnect with his ex-partner Alice, mother of his acerbic daughter Abbie. Alice is now in a relationship with the self-important, Frank McGunn (Nesbitt), Ray’s former P.E. teacher. Homeless Ray drives around with an abandoned couch he found tied to the roof of his car. Abbie has ambitions to become an athlete with Frank using her as a training guinea pig for his sports-themed self-help DVD "The Way of The McGunn". Despite good intentions, Ray unwittingly finds himself responsible for almost destroying all their lives.

Cast
 James Nesbitt as Frank McGunn
 Maisie Williams as Abbie
 David Wilmot as Ray
 Kerry Condon as Alice
 Steven Mackintosh as Gerry
 David McSavage as Therapist
 Lucy Parker Byrne as Karen (as Lucy Byrne)
 Patrick Gibson as Devon
 Dónal Haughey as Stuart
 Eddie Jackson as Gym Receptionist
 Martin Maloney as Kenny
 Ashley McGuire as Rosie

Production
Gold was produced by Tristan Lynch and Aoife O'Sullivan for Subotica in association with Gloucester Place Films with funding from the Irish Film Board and the Broadcasting Authority of Ireland. Principal photography took place in Dublin, County Dublin and County Wicklow.

Reception

Critical response
On the review aggregator website Rotten Tomatoes, the film holds an approval rating of 67% based on 9 reviews, with an average rating of 5.3/10. Leslie Felperin of The Guardian gave it 3 out of 5 stars, and felt "it's quite pleasing that everything doesn't quite work out according to the divine rules of quirky indie comedy." Geoffrey Macnab of The Independent described the film as "a potentially dark family drama [which] is handled in disconcertingly flippant fashion." George Byrne of the Irish Independent concluded his review by stating: "The whole tone of Gold just doesn't hang together, being neither funny at all nor serious enough to be taken seriously." Donald Clarke of The Irish Times gave the film 4 out of 5 stars, and opined that it "remains the sort of picture you want to hug indulgently to a welcoming bosom." Clarke also wrote: "There's not a great deal of plot to the piece. But it gets by on strong performances and convincing characterisation."

Accolades

References

External links
 

2014 films
2014 comedy-drama films
2014 independent films
2010s English-language films
English-language Irish films
Irish comedy-drama films
Irish independent films
Films about families
Films about father–daughter relationships
Films about mother–daughter relationships
Films set in Dublin (city)
Films shot in Dublin (city)
Films shot in County Wicklow